The Thomas-Morse MB-6 was an American racing aircraft built by Thomas-Morse Aircraft for the US Army Air Service.

Development and design
After a Thomas-Morse MB-3 finished second at the 1920 Pulitzer Trophy air race, the Army asked Thomas-Morse to build a new aircraft for the 1921 race. On 21 May 1921 they ordered three aircraft for $48,000 each. The MB-6 was a redesigned MB-3, with a reduced wingspan and  Wright H-2 engine. The three aircraft arrived for testing at McCook Field on 20 September 1921. The first one was for ground testing, the second one first flew on 21 October 1921. The third MB-6 crashed during a landing and was destroyed.

Operational history
The MB-6 competed in the 1921 Pulitzer Trophy. Piloted by Lt. J.A. Mccready, it came in third behind two Curtiss aircraft, with a speed of 160.71 mph (258.64 km/h). The aircraft was given the military designation R-2 in 1922 and scrapped on 31 October 1924.

Operators

United States Army Air Service

Specifications

References

Notes

Bibliography
 
 

1920s United States sport aircraft
Biplanes
Single-engined tractor aircraft
Aircraft first flown in 1924